Timir may refer to:

 Timir Biswas (born 1982) Indian singer in Bengali and Hindi
 Timir Chanda (born 1978) Indian cricketer
 Timir Datta, an Indian-American physicist
 Timir Pinegin (1927-2013) Russian-Soviet sailor
 Timir mine, Sakha, Russia; an iron mine
 HD 148427 (star), constellation Ophiuchus; a K-type subgiant star; named after the Bengali term for darkness

See also